Upset (foaled 1917 in New Jersey) is notable as the only horse to have ever defeated Man o' War.  Man o' War, who would go on to a career in which he won 20 of his 21 starts, faced Upset in the seventh running of the Sanford Memorial Stakes at Saratoga Race Course on August 13, 1919. Losing by a neck, Man o' War had been fractious at the starting line and got a bad start, leaving close to last.  He also carried 15 pounds more than Upset.

Two-year-old season
Upset's victory in the Sanford Memorial was his only stakes win of his 1919 campaign. However, he did very well in other important events, running third in the Juvenile Stakes then had three runner-up finishes in the United States Hotel Stakes, Grand Union Hotel Stakes and the Champagne Stakes.

Three-year-old season
Trained by future Hall of Fame inductee, James G. Rowe Sr., Upset was owned by Harry Payne Whitney. As a three-year-old, the colt won the Havre de Grace Consolation Handicap for Whitney's assistant trainer Abner Clopton then for Rowe Sr. finished second by a head to Paul Jones in the mile and one-quarter Kentucky Derby. He then ran second to Man o' War in the Preakness Stakes, run at a mile and one-eighth. Competing in Kentucky with Clopton handling him, in mid-June Upset won the Latonia Derby over a distance of a mile and one-half.

At stud
Upset sired a number of winners, the most noteworthy of which were Misstep (1925), who won numerous mid-level stakes and had career earnings of $182,815, and Windy City (1926), winner of the American Derby in 1929.

Upset's naming
While it is widely believed that the term "upset", referring to a surprising loss, originated with this horse, that is not the case.  The use of the word in horse racing dates to at least 1877, and the meaning "to overturn" or "overthrow" appears to be even older.

References

1917 racehorse births
1941 racehorse deaths
Racehorses bred in New Jersey
Racehorses trained in the United States
Thoroughbred family 9-b